Nyuksensky District is an administrative and municipal district (raion), one of the twenty-six in Vologda Oblast, Russia. It is located in the northeast of the oblast and borders with Ustyansky District of Arkhangelsk Oblast in the north, Velikoustyugsky District in the east, Kichmengsko-Gorodetsky District in the southeast, Babushkinsky District in the south, Totemsky District in the southwest, and with Tarnogsky District in the west. Its administrative center is the rural locality (a selo) of Nyuksenitsa. District's population:  11,714 (2002 Census);  The population of Nyuksenitsa accounts for 43.7% of the district's total population.

Geography
The district is located on both banks of the Sukhona River. It is elongated from north to south and divided by the Sukhona roughly into two equal parts. The major part of the district belongs to the basin of the Sukhona and two of its tributaries: the Uftyuga (left) and the Gorodishna (right). The rivers in the north of the district drain into the Ustya River basin and thus into the basin of the Vaga, a major tributary of the Northern Dvina. Some rivers in the southeast of the district drain into the Kichmenga and the Sharzhenga, left tributaries of the Yug River. The whole district belongs to the basin of the Northern Dvina.

The district is almost completely covered by coniferous forests (taiga). The exception are the meadows in the floodplains.

History
The area was populated by Finnic peoples and then colonized by the Novgorod Republic (Totma) and Vladimir-Suzdal Principality (Veliky Ustyug). The Novgorod merchants used the Sukhona River as one of the main waterways leading to the White Sea and the Pechora. After the fall of Novgorod, the area became a part of the Grand Duchy of Moscow. The village of Bobrovy Yam (currently Bobrovskoye) was mentioned in the chronicles in 1425. Nyuksenitsa was first mentioned in 1619.

In the course of the administrative reform carried out in 1708 by Peter the Great, the area was included into Archangelgorod Governorate. In 1780, the governorate was abolished and transformed into Vologda Viceroyalty. The latter was abolished in 1796, and the part of it which included Nyuksenitsa became Vologda Governorate. It was included into Velikoustyugsky Uyezd. In 1918, the area was transferred to the newly established Northern Dvina Governorate, and in 1924 the uyezds were abolished in favor of the new divisions, the districts (raions).

Nyuksensky District was established on June 10, 1924 and included areas of former Solvychegodsky and Velikoustyugsky Uyezds. On February 27, 1928, it was renamed Sukhonsky District. In 1929, Northern Dvina Governorate was merged into Northern Krai, and Kokshengsky District was established. On July 30, 1931, Sukhonsky and Kokshengsky Districts were merged, and Nyuksensky District was re-established, with the administrative center located in Nyuksenitsa. In 1935, Tarnogsky District was split off from Nyuksensky District. In 1936, Northern Krai was transformed into Northern Oblast, and in 1937, Northern Oblast itself was split into Arkhangelsk Oblast and Vologda Oblast. Nyuksensky District remained in Vologda Oblast ever since.

Administrative and municipal divisions

Administratively, the district is divided into eleven selsoviets. Municipally, the district is incorporated as Nyuksensky Municipal District and is divided into four rural settlements. The municipal district includes all of the inhabited localities of the administrative district, with the exception of the settlement of Ilezka, which is municipally a part of Babushkinsky District.

Economy

Industry
The economy of the district is based on timber production. There is some food industry present, including a milk factory in Nyuksenitsa.

Agriculture
There is cattle farming in the district, which is still in crisis after the fall in the 1990s. Another  are hunting grounds.

Transportation
Nyuksenitsa stands on the road connecting Vologda and Veliky Ustyug, and in Nyuksenitsa the road moves over the bridge from the left bank to the right bank of the Sukhona. Another paved road branches off in Nyuksenitsa northwest to Tarnogsky Gorodok and further to Oktyabrsky in Arkhangelsk Oblast. There is regular passenger bus service on both roads.

The Sukhona is navigable within the district; however, there is no passenger navigation.

Nyuksenitsa has an oil-pumping station in the Baltic Pipeline System.

Culture and recreation
The district contains 130 objects classified as cultural and historical heritage of local importance. Most of these are wooden farm buildings and churches built prior to 1917.

The only state museum in the district is the Nyuksenitsa Regional Museum, located in Nyuksenitsa.

References

Notes

Sources

Districts of Vologda Oblast